Cam Phước Tây is a rural commune of Cam Lâm District in Khánh Hòa Province, Vietnam.

References

Communes of Khánh Hòa province
Populated places in Khánh Hòa province